Surface Water Improvement and Management Program (S.W.I.M, sometimes written as SWIM) is a Florida state program to improve Florida's water quality.

History 
Swim was started in 1988 by the Department of Environmental Protection to address Florida's worsening water quality and protect drinking water quality.

References 

Environment of Florida
1988 establishments in Florida